Narasimhavarman I was a emperor of the Pallava dynasty who ruled South India from 630 CE – 668 CE. He shared his father Mahendravarman I's love of art and completed the work started by Mahendravarman in Mamallapuram. During his reign famous Pancha Rathas Temple was constructed which is Rock Cut Temple, a UNESCO World Heritage Site.

He avenged his father's defeat at the hands of the Chalukya king, Pulakeshin II in the year 642 CE. Narasimhavarman I was also known as Mamallan (great wrestler), and Mamallapuram (Mahabalipuram) was named after him.

It was during his reign, in 640 CE, that the Chinese traveller Hiuen Tsang visited Kanchipuram.

Narasimhavarman I was a devotee of Shiva. The great Nayanar saints like Appar, Siruthondar  and Tirugnanasambandar lived during his reign.

Narasimhavarman I was succeeded by his son Mahendravarman II in the year 668 CE.

Military conquests

Narasimhavarman I is claimed to be one of the Indian kings who never lost on the battlefield to their enemies. 
Pulakeshin II, a Chalukya king, had previously raided various northern Pallava provinces and forts. However, he was unable to capture the Pallava capital of Kanchipuram. This led to a long conflict between the Chalukyas and the Pallavas.

Pulakeshin II again attempted to seize the Pallava capital and undertook another expedition several years later. However, the Pallava reign had moved on to Narasimhavarman I by then. Narasimhavarman defeated the Chalukyas in several battles, including one at Manimangalam 20 miles to the east of Kanchipuram. The king states that he could see the back of his dreaded enemy as he tore apart his army. Encouraged by this victory, Narasimhavarman led his army along with his general Paranjothi and invaded Vatapi, successfully defeating and killing the Chalukya king Pulakeshin II in 642 CE. The city was never a capital again. He returned victorious to Kanchipuram, and was given the title Vatapikondan (one who conquered Vatapi).

His general Paranjothi (a Vikrama Kesari, also known as paradurgamarddana) was known very well for his devotion to Lord Siva and as one of the 63 Nayanar saints, is said to have indeed personally destroyed the city of Vatapi under the command of Narasimhavarman I. Sekkizhaar's work 12th tirumurai credits this siruttondar of having destroyed the evil kali as manifested by the deccan enemy of pallavas. He is also known as 'Siruthonttar', a dutiful warrior and a practicing medic who had "mastered several treatises in medicine". This vikramakesari had at the insistence of Lord Sivan sacrificed his child without any qualms.  There was a confusion as to whether the Ganesha at a temple in Chengattankudy could have been a result of this invasion. Many grants refer to this event as: "kilisayoneriva vimattita vathapi" or the one who destroyed Vatapi, the same way Sage Agastya had killed a demon by that name long ago.(**)

Influence on Sri Lankan politics
The Sinhalese prince Manavarma lived at the court of Narasimhavarman and had helped him crush his enemy Pulakeshin II. In return, Narasimhavarman had helped Manavarma twice with an army to invade Sri Lanka. The second attack was successful. Manavarma occupied Sri Lanka, over which he is supposed to have ruled from 691 to 726 CE. The Kasakudi copper plates refer to Narasimhavarman's conquest of Sri Lanka. The Mahavamsa also confirms these facts.

Narasimhavarman in literature
Kalki Krishnamurthy's  work, Sivagamiyin Sabadham, is based on Narasimhavarman's early years and his battles with the Chalukyas. Kalki Krishnamurthy's Parthiban kanavu is based on the later years of Narasimhavarman's rule. He completed most of the monuments in Mahabalipuram, which in modern times are grouped as Group of Monuments at Mahabalipuram and one of the UNESCO world heritage sites.

Notes

References
 
 
 

(**) Ancient India, R. C. Majumdar, Ancient India, K.A.Nilakanta Sastri

External links
 Inscriptions of India -- Complete listing of historical inscriptions from Indian temples and monuments

Pallava kings
7th-century monarchs in Asia